Jeff Melcher (born August 30, 1960) is an American business executive who is the CEO of Netstandard and Accutype. Melcher is also a former Republican member of the Kansas Senate, representing the 11th district from 2013 to 2017.

References

External links
Vote Smart Jeff Melcher

Living people
Republican Party Kansas state senators
21st-century American politicians
People from Leawood, Kansas
1960 births
Missouri University of Science and Technology alumni